Gandhmow is a village in Kamrup rural district, in the state of Assam, India, situated in north bank of river Brahmaputra.

Transport
The village is located west of National Highway 427 and connected to nearby towns and cities like Guwahati with regular buses and other modes of transportation.

See also
 Gerua
 Dumunichowki

References

Villages in Kamrup district